Todendorf is a municipality in the district of Stormarn, in Schleswig-Holstein, Germany.

References

Municipalities in Schleswig-Holstein
Stormarn (district)